Apterichtus equatorialis, the finless eel or equatorial eel, is a species of snake eel native to the eastern Pacific Ocean, from the Gulf of California to Panama and around the Galapagos Islands.  This species can be found at depths of from  inhabiting areas with bottoms of sand or mud.  This species can reach a length of  TL.

Due to its wide distribution in the eastern Pacific, a lack of known threats, and a lack of observed population decline, the IUCN redlist currently lists the Finless eel as Least Concern. No conservation actions have been taken specifically for the species, but it inhabits a number of marine protected areas.

References

equatorialis
Fish described in 1941